Men Without Women may refer to:

 Men Without Women (short story collection), a 1927 collection of short stories by Ernest Hemingway
 Men Without Women (Murakami short story collection), a 2017 collection of short stories by Haruki Murakami
 Men Without Women (film), a 1930 war drama
 Men Without Women (album), a 1982 album by Steven Van Zandt as "Little Steven & The Disciples of Soul"
 "Men Without Women" (Porridge), a 1974 episode of the BBC sitcom Porridge
 Men Without Women (mural), a 1932 mural by Stuart Davis
 "Men Without Women", a 2007 episode of The IT Crowd